Pierre Legendre  (born 5 October 1946), is a professor of ecology at Université de Montréal. He is the founder of Numerical Ecology, which is a quantitative subdiscipline of community ecology, with his brother the oceanographer Louis Legendre.

Pierre Legendre obtained an MSc in zoology from McGill University in 1969, and at age 24, he earned a PhD in evolutionary biology from the University of Colorado in 1971. From 1971 to 1972, he worked as a postdoctoral fellow at Lund University. From 1972 to 1980, he was employed at Université du Québec à Montréal. Since 1980, he is professor in the Département de sciences biologiques of Université de Montréal.

As of October 2021, Legendre had published 12 books and over 340 scientific papers. He has been listed as a Web of Science Highly Cited Researcher in Ecology/Environment in all lists that have been published to this day: in 2001, then from 2014 to 2021. His Hirsch index (h) is 80 on Web of Knowledge, which does not count the citations of his books, and 114 on Google Scholar, which includes these citations.

By the number of citations, he is the most cited author of ecology journals such as Ecology, Ecological Monographs, Journal of Classification, Plant Ecology.

Scientific prizes 
 1986 – Michel-Jurdant Prize (with Louis Legendre), Acfas
 1994 – Distinguished Statistical Ecologist Award, International Congress of Ecology
 1995 – Miroslaw Romanowski Medal, Royal Society of Canada
 1999 – Twentieth Century Distinguished Service Award, Ninth Lukacs Symposium, Bowling Green State University, USA
 2005 – Prix Marie-Victorin, Government of Québec
 2013 – President's Award, Canadian Society for Ecology and Evolution
 2015 – Adrien-Poulliot Award, Acfas
 2019 – Alexander von Humboldt Medal, International Association for Vegetation Science (IAVS)

Teaching prizes 
 2011 – Excellence in Teaching Award, Université de Montréal
 2011 – Excellence in Teaching Award, Faculty of Arts and Science, Université de Montréal

Other distinctions 
 1989 – Killam Research Fellow, Canada Council for the Arts
 1992 – Elected Fellow, Royal Society of Canada
 2007 – Officer of the National Order of Québec, Government of Québec
 2016 – Corresponding Member, Academia Mexicana de Ciencias
 2019 – Honorary Member, Sociedad Ibérica de Ecología
 2001 – ISI Highly Cited Researcher in Ecology/Environment awarded by the Institute for Scientific Information, USA
 2014 to 2021 – Web of Science Highly Cited Researcher in Environment/Ecology awarded by Thomson Reuters, then by Clarivate Analytics, USA

References

External links
, Département de sciences biologiques, Université de Montréal

Living people
1946 births
Canadian ecologists
University of Colorado alumni
McGill University Faculty of Science alumni
Academic staff of the Université de Montréal
Academic staff of the Université du Québec à Montréal
Fellows of the Royal Society of Canada
Officers of the National Order of Quebec
Members of the Mexican Academy of Sciences
Members of the Order of Canada